The 2nd Lo Nuestro Awards ceremony, presented by Univision honoring the best Latin music of 1989 and 1990 took place on May 24, 1990, at a live presentation held at the Knight Center in Miami, Florida. The ceremony was broadcast in the United States and Latin America by Univision.

During the ceremony, sixteen categories were presented. Winners were announced at the live event and included Nicaraguan singer Luis Enrique receiving three competitive awards. Mexican singer-songwriter Ana Gabriel, French band Kaoma, and Mexican group Bronco, and performer Vicente Fernández earned two accolades each.

Background 
In 1989, the Lo Nuestro Awards were established by Univision, to recognize the most talented performers of Latin music. The nominees and winners were selected by a voting poll conducted among program directors of Spanish-language radio stations in the United States and also based on chart performance on Billboard Latin music charts, with the results being tabulated and certified by the accounting firm Deloitte. The award included a trophy shaped like a treble clef. The categories were for the Pop, Tropical/Salsa, and Regional Mexican genres. The 2nd Lo Nuestro Awards ceremony was held on May 24, 1991, in a live presentation held at the Knight Center in Miami, Florida. The ceremony was broadcast in the United States and Latin America by Univision.

Winners and nominees 

Winners were announced before the live audience during the ceremony. Mexican singer Vicente Fernández and group Los Yonics, and Puerto-Rican band El Gran Combo de Puerto Rico were the most nominated acts with four nominations each. Fernández won two awards for Regional/Mexican Artist and Song of the Year for his top ten single "Por Tu Maldito Amor". Mexican singer-songwriter Ana Gabriel was awarded for Female Pop Artist and Pop Album of the Year with Tierra de Nadie.

Nicaraguan singer Luis Enrique dominated the Tropical/Salsa field winning all his nominations, including Artist, Song and Album of the Year for his release Mi Mundo. Cuban-American singer Celia Cruz earned the first Lifetime Achievement Award and fellow Cuban performer Gloria Estefan won for Crossover Artist of the Year.

Presenters

Source:

Performers

Source:

See also
1989 in Latin music
1990 in Latin music
Grammy Award for Best Latin Pop Album

References

1990 music awards
Lo Nuestro Awards by year
1990 in Florida
1990 in Latin music
1990s in Miami